Finnie Bay is an arm of the Foxe Basin in the Qikiqtaaluk Region of Nunavut, Canada. It is located on the northeastern Foxe Peninsula, in western Baffin Island.

References

Bays of Foxe Basin